North American moths represent about 12,000 types of moths. In comparison, there are about 825 species of North American butterflies. The moths (mostly nocturnal) and butterflies (mostly diurnal) together make up the taxonomic order Lepidoptera.

This list is sorted on MONA number (MONA is short for Moths of America North of Mexico). A numbering system for North American moths introduced by Ronald W. Hodges, et al. in 1983 in the publication Check List of the Lepidoptera of America North of Mexico. The list has since been updated, but the placement in families is outdated for some species.

This list covers America north of Mexico (effectively the continental United States and Canada). For a list of moths and butterflies recorded from the state of Hawaii, see List of Lepidoptera of Hawaii.

This is a partial list, covering moths with MONA numbers ranging from 5510 to 6088. For the rest of the list, see List of moths of North America.

Pyralidae
no number yet – Paragalasa exospinalis
5510 – Pyralis farinalis, meal moth
5511 – Aglossa costiferalis
5512 – Aglossa disciferalis, pink-masked pyralid moth
5513 W – Aglossa electalis
5514 W – Aglossa cacamica
5515 – Pyralis manihotalis, tropical meal moth
5516 – Aglossa pinguinalis, large tabby moth
5517 – Aglossa caprealis, stored grain moth
5518 – Aglossa cuprina, grease moth
5519 – Aglossa acallalis
5520 – Aglossa baba
5521 – Aglossa gigantalis
5522 – Aglossa furva
5523 – Aglossa oculalis
5524 – Hypsopygia costalis, clover hayworm moth
5525 – Dolichomia planalis
5526 – Pseudasopia intermedialis, red-shawled moth
5527 – Pseudasopia phoezalis
5528 – Pseudasopia cohortalis
5529 – Dolichomia thymetusalis, spruce needleworm moth
5530 – Dolichomia binodulalis, pink-fringed dolichomia moth
5531 – Ocrasa nostralis, southern hayworm moth
5533 – Dolichomia olinalis, yellow-fringed dolichomia moth
5534 – Arispe cestalis
5535 – Arispe atalis
5536 – Neodavisia singularis
5536.1 – Neodavisia melusina
5537 – Caphys arizonensis
5538 – Parachma ochracealis
5540 – Basacallis tarachodes
5541 – Acallis gripalis
5542 – Acallis centralis
5543 – Acallis alticolalis
5544 W – Zaboba mitchelli
5545 – Zaboba unicoloralis
5546 – Anemosella nevalis
5547 W – Anemosella obliquata
5548 – Anemosella polingalis
5549 – Anemosella viridalis
5550 – Lepidomys irrenosa
5551 – Negalasa fumalis
5552 – Galasa nigrinodis, boxwood leaftier moth
5553 – Galasa nigripunctalis
5554 – Tetraschistis leucogramma, Amazon queen moth
5555 – Penthesilea sacculalis
5556 – Tosale oviplagalis, dimorphic tosale moth
5557 – Tosale similalis
5558 – Tosale aucta
5559 – Salobrena sincera
5560 – Salobrena rubiginea
5560.1 – Salobrena vacuana
5561 – Epitamyra birectalis
5562 W – Satole ligniperdalis
5563 – Clydonopteron sacculana, trumpet vine moth
5564 – Bonchis munitalis
5565 – Streptopalpia minusculalis
5566 – Arta statalis, posturing arta moth
5567 W – Arta epicoenalis
5568 – Arta olivalis, olive arta moth
no number yet – Arta brevivalvalis
5571 – Condylolomia participalis, drab condylolomia moth
5572 – Blepharocerus rosellus
5573 – Blepharocerus ignitalis
5574 – Heliades mulleolella
5574.1 – Heliades huachucalis
no number yet – Heliades lindae
5575 – Macalla thyrsisalis, mahogany webworm moth
5576 – Macalla phaeobasalis
5576.1 – Macalla glastionalis
5577 – Epipaschia superatalis, dimorphic macalla moth
5578 – Cacozelia pemphusalis
5579 – Macalla zelleri, Zeller's epipaschia moth
5580 W – Cacozelia basiochrealis, yellow-based cacozelia moth
5581 – Milgithea alboplagialis
5581.1 – Milgithea trilinearis
5582 – Deuterollyta majuscula
5584 – Toripalpus breviornatalis
5585 W – Toripalpus trabalis
5586 – Cacozelia interruptella
5587 – Cacozelia elegans
5588 – Oneida lunulalis, orange-tufted oneida moth
5588.1 W – Oneida grisiella
5589 W – Oneida luniferella
5590 – Tallula atramentalis
5591 – Tallula atrifascialis
5592 – Tallula watsoni, Watson's tallula moth
5593 – Tallula baboquivarialis
5594 – Tallula fieldi
5594.1 – Phidotricha erigens
5595 – Pococera robustella, pine webworm moth
5596 – Pococera scortealis, lespedeza webworm moth
5597 – Pococera melanogrammos, black-letter pococera moth
5598 – Pococera texanella
5599 – Pococera callipeplella
5600 – Pococera speciosella
5601 – Pococera floridella
5602 – Pococera subcanalis, cloaked pococera moth
5603 – Pococera maritimalis
5604 – Pococera militella, sycamore webworm moth
5605 – Pococera aplastella, aspen webworm moth
5606 – Pococera asperatella, maple webworm moth
5607 – Pococera vacciniivora
5608 – Pococera expandens, striped oak webworm moth
5609 – Pococera spaldingella
5610 – Pococera dolorosella
5611 – Pococera provoella
5612 – Pococera arizonella
5613 – Pococera thoracicella
5614 – Pococera griseella
5615 – Pococera fuscolotella
5616 – Pococera tiltella
5617 – Pococera humerella
5618 – Pococera gelidalis
5619 – Pococera baptisiella
5620 W – Pococera euphemella, mesquite leaf tier moth
5621 – Coenodomus hockingii
5621.1 – Cryptoblabes gnidiella
5621.2 – Stenopaschia trichopteris
5622 – Galleria mellonella, greater wax moth
5623 – Achroia grisella, lesser wax moth
5624 – Trachylepidia fructicassiella
5625 – Omphalocera cariosa
5626 W – Omphalocera occidentalis
5627 – Omphalocera munroei, asimina webworm moth
5628 – Thyridopyralis gallaerandialis
5629 – Aphomia sociella, the bee moth
5630 – Aphomia terrenella, terrenella bee moth
5631 – Aphomia fuscolimbella
5632 – Paralipsa gularis, stored nut moth
5633 – Paralipsa decorella
5633.1 – Paralipsa fulminalis
5633.2 – Epimorius testaceellus, bromeliad pod borer moth
5634 – Corcyra cephalonica, rice moth
5635 – Cacotherapia interalbicalis
5636 – Cacotherapia bilinealis
5637 – Cacotherapia angulalis
5638 – Cacotherapia unicoloralis
5639 – Cacotherapia unipuncta
5640 – Cacotherapia ponda
5641 – Cacotherapia nigrocinereella
5642 – Cacotherapia flexilinealis
5643 W – Cacotherapia leucocope
5644 – Cacotherapia lecerfialis
5645 – Alpheias vicarilis
5646 – Alpheias transferrens
5647 – Alpheias querula
5648 – Alpheias oculiferalis
5649 – Alpheioides parvulalis
5650 – Decaturia pectinalis
5651 – Acrobasis indigenella, leaf crumpler moth
5652 – Acrobasis grossbecki
5653 – Acrobasis vaccinii, cranberry fruitworm moth
5654 – Acrobasis amplexella
5655 – Acrobasis tricolorella, destructive pruneworm moth
5656 – Acrobasis comptella
5659 – Acrobasis palliolella, mantled acrobasis moth
5660 – Acrobasis caryalbella
5661 – Acrobasis juglandis, pecan leaf casebearer moth
5662 – Acrobasis sylviella, ironwood tubemaker moth
5662.1 – Acrobasis kylesi
5663 – Acrobasis kearfottella, Kearfott's acrobasis moth
5664 – Acrobasis caryae, hickory shoot borer moth
5665 – Acrobasis carpinivorella
5666 – Acrobasis elyi
5666.1 – Acrobasis texana
5667 – Acrobasis nuxvorella, pecan nut casebearer moth
5667.1 – Acrobasis juglanivorella
5668 – Acrobasis evanescentella
5668.1 – Acrobasis caulivorella
5669 – Acrobasis stigmella
5670 – Acrobasis aurorella
5672 – Acrobasis exsulella, cordovan pyralid moth
5673 – Acrobasis angusella, hickory leafstem borer moth
5674 – Acrobasis demotella, walnut shoot moth
5675 – Acrobasis latifasciella
5676 – Acrobasis irrubriella
5677 – Acrobasis normella
5680 – Acrobasis ostryella
5682 – Acrobasis coryliella
5684 – Acrobasis cirroferella
5685 – Acrobasis cunulae
5686 – Acrobasis caryivorella, hickory shoot moth
5688 – Acrobasis betulella, birch tubemaker moth
5689 – Acrobasis betulivorella
5690 – Acrobasis rubrifasciella, alder tubemaker moth
5691 – Acrobasis comptoniella, sweetfern leaf casebearer moth
5692 – Acrobasis myricella
5694 – Acrobasis blanchardorum
5695 W – Trachycera caliginella
5702 – Trachycera suavella
5703 – Trachycera pallicornella
5704 – Anabasis ochrodesma, cassia webworm moth
5705 – Hypsipyla grandella, mahogany shootborer moth
5705.1 – Anypsipyla univitella
5706 – Crocidomera imitata
5707 W – Cuniberta subtinctella
5708 – Adanarsa intransitella
5709 W – Bertelia grisella
5710 – Bertelia dupla
5711 – Hypargyria slossonella
5712 W – Chararica annuliferella
5713 – Chararica hystriculella
5714 – Chararica bicolorella
5715 – Myelois grossipunctella
5717 – Myelopsis immundella
5718 – Myelopsis subtetricella
5719 – Myelopsis minutularia
5720 – Myelopsis alatella
5720.1 – Myelopsoides venustus
5721 – Apomyelois bistriatella
5722 – Ectomyelois decolor, Caribbean dried fruit moth
5723 – Ectomyelois ceratoniae, locust bean moth
5724 – Amyelois transitella, navel orangeworm moth
5725 – Fundella pellucens, Caribbean podborer moth
5726 – Fundella argentina
5726.1 – Fundella ignobilis
5727 W – Promylea lunigerella
5728 – Anadelosemia texanella
5729 – Anadelosemia condigna
5730 W – Dasypyga alternosquamella
5731 W – Dasypyga salmocolor
5732 – Davara caricae, papaya webworm moth
5733 – Sarasota plumigerella
5734 – Atheloca subrufella, palm bud moth
5735 – Triozosneura dorsonotata
5736 – Monoptilota pergratialis, lima-bean vine borer moth
5737 – Zamagiria australella
5738 – Philocrotona kendalli
5739 – Zamagiria laidion
5740 – Anegcephalesis arctella
5741 – Ancylostomia stercorea
5742 – Caristanius decoloralis, caristanius moth
5743 – Caristanius minimus
5744 – Etiella zinckenella, gold-banded etiella moth
5745 – Glyptocera consobrinella
5746 – Pima boisduvaliella
5747 – Pima albiplagiatella, white-edged pima moth
5747.1 W – Pima occidentalis
5748 W – Pima fosterella
5750 – Pima albocostalialis
5751 – Pima fulvirugella
5752 W – Pima granitella
5753 – Pima parkerella
5753.1 – Pima fergusoni
5754 – Pimodes insularis
5754.1 – Pimodes caliginosus
5755 – Interjectio denticulella
5756 W – Interjectio columbiella
5758 – Interjectio niviella
5759 – Ambesa laetella
5760 W – Ambesa walsinghami
5760.1 – Ambesa mirabella
5761 – Ambesa lallatalis
5761.1 – Ambesa dentifera
5762 – Catastia bistriatella
5763 – Catastia incorruscella
5764 – Catastia actualis
5764.1 – Catastia subactualis
5765 – Glyphocystis viridivallis
5766 – Immyrla nigrovittella
5767 – Oreana unicolorella
5768 – Olybria aliculella
5769 – Olybria furciferella
5770 – Salebriacus odiosellus
5770.1 – Salebriaria ademptandella
5771 – Salebriaria turpidella
5772 – Salebriaria nubiferella
5772.1 – Salebriaria borealis
5772.2 – Salebriaria chisosensis
5773 – Salebriaria engeli, Engel's salebriaria moth
5773.1 – Salebriaria roseopunctella
5773.2 – Salebriaria rufimaculatella
5774 – Salebriaria annulosella
5774.1 – Salebriaria robustella
5774.2 – Salebriaria bella
5774.3 – Salebriaria fergusonella
5774.4 – Salebriaria grandidentalis
5775 – Salebriaria tenebrosella
5775.1 – Salebriaria fasciata
5775.2 – Salebriaria rufimaculatella
5775.3 – Salebriaria squamopalpiella
5775.4 – Salebriaria equivoca
5775.5 – Salebriaria integra
5775.6 – Salebriaria maximella
5775.7 – Salebriaria simpliciella
5775.8 – Salebriaria carolynae
5775.9 – Salebriaria kanawha
5776 – Salebriaria pumilella
5776.1 – Salebriaria floridana
5776.2 – Salebriaria pallidella
5777 – Quasisalebria fructetella
5777.1 – Quasisalebria occidentalis
5778 – Pempelia nigricans
5779 W – Quasisalebria admixta
5779.1 – Quasisalebria atratella
5780 – Ortholepis jugosella
5781 – Ortholepis myricella
5781.1 – Ortholepis baloghi
5782 – Ortholepis rhodorella
5783 – Ortholepis pasadamia, striped birch pyralid moth
5784 W – Polopeustis arctiella
5785 W – Meroptera mirandella
5785.1 W – Meroptera anaimella
5785.2 – Meroptera nevadensis
5786 – Meroptera cviatella, poplar bud borer moth
5787 – Meroptera pravella, lesser aspen webworm moth
5788 – Meroptera abditiva
5789 – Sciota subfuscella, striped sumac leafroller moth
5790 – Sciota delassalis
5790.1 – Sciota fraudifera
5791 – Sciota rubescentella
5792 – Sciota fernaldi
5793 W – Sciota dammersi
5793.1 – Sciota floridenesis, Florida sciota moth
5794 – Sciota vetustella
5795 – Sciota inconditella
5796 – Sciota subcaesiella, locust leafroller moth
5797 – Sciota virgatella, black-spotted leafroller moth
5798 – Sciota carneella, willow gall inquiline moth
5799 – Sciota basilaris
5800 W – Sciota termitalis
5800.1 – Sciota levigatella
5800.2 – Sciota californiana
5800.3 – Sciota yuconella
5801 W – Sciota bifasciella
5802 – Sciota uvinella, sweetgum leafroller moth
5803 – Sciota celtidella
5804 – Sciota rubrisparsella
5805 W – Sciota gilvibasella
5805.1 – Sciota quasisubfuscella
5806 – Sciota crassifasciella
5808 – Tlascala reductella, tlascala moth
5809 – Tulsa finitella
5810 – Tulsa umbripennis
5811 – Tulsa oregonella
5812 – Telethusia ovalis
5814 – Phobus brucei
5815 – Phobus funerellus
5816 – Phobus curvatellus
5817 – Phobus incertus
5818 – Actrix nyssaecolella, tupelo leaffolder moth
5819 – Actrix dissimulatrix
5820 – Stylopalpia scobiella
5820.1 – Stylopalpia lunigerella
5821 – Hypochalcia hulstiella
5822 W – Pyla fasciolalis
5823 W – Pyla impostor
5824 – Pyla aequivoca
5824.1 – Pyla arenaeola
5826 – Pyla insinuatrix
5827 – Pyla aenigmatica
5828 – Pyla criddlella
5829 – Pyla fusca, speckled black pyla moth
5830 – Pyla hypochalciella
5831 – Pyla hanhamella
5831.1 – Pyla westerlandi
5832 – Pyla scintillans
5832.1 – Pyla longispina
5832.2 – Pyla serrata
5833 – Pyla rainierella
5834 – Pyla aeneella
5835 W – Pyla aeneoviridella
5836 – Pyla metalicella
5837 – Pyla fasciella
5838 – Pyla nigricula
5839 – Pyla viridisuffusella
5840 – Phycitopsis flavicornella
5841 – Dioryctria abietivorella, evergreen coneworm moth
5842 – Dioryctria taedae
5843 – Dioryctria reniculelloides, spruce coneworm moth
5844 W – Dioryctria pseudotsugella
5845 W – Dioryctria rossi
5846 W – Dioryctria auranticella, ponderosa pineconeworm moth
5847 – Dioryctria disclusa, webbing coneworm moth
5848 – Dioryctria erythropasa
5849 – Dioryctria pygmaeella, bald cypress coneworm moth
5849.1 W – Dioryctria caesirufella
5850 W – Dioryctria ponderosae
5851 – Dioryctria okanaganella
5851.1 – Dioryctria hodgesi
5852 – Dioryctria zimmermani, Zimmerman pine moth
5852.1 – Dioryctria delectella
5853 – Dioryctria amatella, southern pineconeworm moth
5854 W – Dioryctria cambiicola, western pine moth
5854.1 – Dioryctria merkeli, loblolly pineconeworm moth
5855 – Dioryctria tumicolella
5856 – Dioryctria contortella
5857 – Dioryctria monticolella
5858 – Dioryctria banksiella
5859 – Dioryctria albovittella
5859.1 W – Dioryctria westerlandi
5859.2 – Dioryctria fordi
5859.3 – Dioryctria mutuurai
5860 – Dioryctria baumhoferi
5861 W – Dioryctria pentictonella
5861.1 – Dioryctria resinosella, red pine shoot moth
5861.2 – Dioryctria muricativorella
5861.3 – Dioryctria vancouverella
5861.4 – Dioryctria durangoensis
5862 W – Dioryctria gulosella
5863 W – Dioryctria subtracta
5863.1 – Dioryctria clarioralis, blister coneworm moth
5863.2 – Dioryctria inyoensis
5863.3 – Dioryctria sierra
5863.4 – Dioryctria ebeli, south coastal coneworm moth
5863.5 – Dioryctria taedivorella, lesser loblolly pineconeworm moth
5863.6 – Dioryctria yatesi, mountain pineconeworm moth
5864 – Oryctometopia fossulatella
5865 – Sarata edwardsialis
5866 – Sarata pullatella
5867 – Sarata punctella
5868 W – Sarata incanella
5869 – Sarata atrella
5870 – Sarata caudellella
5871 – Sarata dnopherella
5872 – Sarata nigrifasciella
5873 – Sarata cinereella
5874 – Sarata rubrithoracella
5875 – Sarata tephrella
5885 – Philodema rhoiella
5886 – Lipographis fenestrella
5888 – Lipographis truncatella
5889 – Lipographis umbrella
5889.1 – Quasisarata subosseella
5890 – Adelphia petrella
5891 – Pseudadelphia ochripunctella
5892 W – Ufa lithosella
5894 W – Ufa senta
5895 – Ufa rubedinella
5896 – Elasmopalpus lignosellus, lesser cornstalk borer moth
5897 – Acroncosa albiflavella
5897.1 – Acroncosa minima
5897.2 – Acroncosa castrella
5898 – Acroncosa similella
5899 W – Passadena flavidorsella
5899.1 W – Passadenoides montanus
5899.2 – Passadenoides donahuei
5899.3 – Passadenoides pullus
5899.4 – Chorrera extrincica
5900 – Ulophora groteii
5901 W – Tacoma feriella
5902 – Ragonotia dotalis
5903 – Martia arizonella
5904 W – Eumysia mysiella
5905 – Eumysia maidella
5906 – Eumysia fuscatella
5907 – Eumysia semicana
5908 – Eumysia idahoensis
5908.1 – Eumysia pallidipennella
5909 – Macrorrhinia ochrella
5911 – Macrorrhinia parvulella
5912 W – Macrorrhinia aureofasciella
5913 – Macrorrhinia endonephele
5914 – Macrorrhinia dryadella
5914.5 – Arcola malloi, alligatorweed stem borer moth
5915 – Maricopa lativittella
5916 W – Heterographis morrisonella
5917 – Staudingeria albipenella
5918 – Hulstia undulatella, sugarbeet crown borer moth
5919 – Honora mellinella
5920 – Honora subsciurella
5921 – Honora sciurella
5922 – Honora dotella
5923 W – Honora montinatatella
5924 – Honora perdubiella
5925 – Honora dulciella
5926 – Canarsia ulmiarrosorella, elm leaftier moth
5927 – Eurythmidia ignidorsella
5928 – Wunderia neaeriatella
5929 – Diviana eudoreella
5930 – Palatka nymphaeella
5930.1 – Palatka powelli
5931 – Psorosina hammondi
5932 – Patriciola semicana
5933 – Anderida sonorella
5933.1 – Anderida peorinella
5933.2 – Cassiana malacella
5934 – Mescinia estrella
5934.1 – Mescinia berosa
5934.2 – Mescinia parvula
5934.3 W – Mescinia texanica
5935 – Homoeosoma electella, sunflower moth
5935.1 – Homoeosoma nanophasma
5935.2 – Homoeosoma phaeoboreas
5936 – Homoeosoma stypticella
5937 W – Homoeosoma striatellum
5937.1 – Homoeosoma asylonnastes
5938 – Homoeosoma oslarellum
5938.1 – Homoeosoma parvalbum
5938.2 – Homoeosoma oxycercus
5939 – Homoeosoma illuviella
5939.1 – Homoeosoma emandator
5941 – Homoeosoma albescentella
5942 W – Homoeosoma impressalis
5943 – Homoeosoma inornatella
5943.1 – Homoeosoma uncanale
5944 – Homoeosoma deceptorium
5944.1 W – Homoeosoma eremophasma
5944.2 – Homoeosoma ammonastes
5944.3 – Homoeosoma pedionnastes
5944.4 – Homoeosoma ardaloniphas
5945 – Patagonia peregrinum
5946 W – Phycitodes albatella
5946.1 W – Phycitodes mucidella
5946.2 – Phycitodes reliquella
5947 – Unadilla maturella
5948 – Unadilla erronella
5949 – Laetilia coccidivora, scale-feeding snout moth
5949.1 W – Laetilia dilatifasciella
5949.2 – Laetilia hulstii
5950 W – Laetilia zamacrella
5951 – Laetilia myersella
5952 W – Laetilia ephestiella
5953 – Laetilia fiskella
5953.1 – Laetilia cinerosella
5953.2 – Laetilia bellivorella
5954 – Rostrolaetilia placidella
5955 – Rostrolaetilia minimella
5956 – Rostrolaetilia placidissima
5957 – Rostrolaetilia utahensis
5958 – Rostrolaetilia coloradella
5959 – Rostrolaetilia eureka
5960 W – Rostrolaetilia nigromaculella
5961 – Rostrolaetilia ardiferella
5962 W – Rostrolaetilia texanella
5963 – Rostrolaetilia pinalensis
5964 – Welderella parvella
5965 – Baphala pallida
5965.1 – Baphala eremiella
5965.2 – Baphala phaeolella
5966 W – Rhagea packardella
5967 – Rhagea stigmella
5968 – Zophodia grossulariella, gooseberry fruitworm moth
5968.1 W – Zophodia multistriatella
5969 – Zophodia epischnioides
5970 – Melitara prodenialis, eastern cactus-boring moth
5970.1 – Cactoblastis cactorum, cactus moth
5971 W – Melitara dentata
5971.1 W – Melitara doddalis
5971.2 – Melitara texana
5971.3 – Melitara apicigrammella
5972 W – Melitara junctolineella
5973 W – Melitara subumbrella
5974 W – Alberada parabates
5975 W – Alberada bidentella
5975.1 – Alberada californiensis
5975.2 – Alberada franclemonti
5975.3 – Alberada candida
5977 W – Cahela ponderosella, cahela moth
5978 – Rumatha glaucatella
5979 W – Rumatha bihinda
5979.1 – Rumatha jacumba
5980 W – Rumatha polingella
5981 W – Yosemitia graciella
5983 – Yosemitia fieldiella
5984 W – Eremberga leuconips
5985 – Eremberga creabates
5986 – Eremberga insignis
5987 – Ozamia fuscomaculella
5987.1 – Ozamia clarefacta
5988 – Ozamia thalassophila
5988.1 – Ozamia lucidalis
5989 W – Cactobrosis fernaldialis
5991 W – Echinocereta strigalis
5992 – Lascelina canens
5993 – Metephestia simplicula
5993.1 – Protasia mirabilicornella
5994 – Selga arizonella
5994.1 – Selga californica
5994.2 W – Pseudocabima arizonensis
5994.3 – Pseudocabotia balconiensis
5995 – Euzophera semifuneralis, American plum borer moth
5995.1 – Euzophera aglaeella
5995.2 – Euzophera habrella
5995.3 W – Euzophera vinnulella
5996 – Euzophera magnolialis, magnolia borer moth
5997 – Euzophera ostricolorella, root collar borer moth
5998 – Euzophera nigricantella
5999 – Eulogia ochrifrontella, broad-banded eulogia moth
6000 W – Ephestiodes gilvescentella
6001 – Ephestiodes infimella
6001.1 – Ephestiodes monticolus
6002 W – Ephestiodes erythrella
6003 – Ephestiodes mignonella
6003.1 – Ephestiodes griseus
6004 – Ephestiodes erasa
6004.1 – Australephestiodes stictella
6005 – Moodna ostrinella, darker moodna moth
6005.1 – Moodna pallidostrinella, paler moodna moth
6006 – Moodna bisinuella
6007 – Vitula edmandsii, dried fruit moth
6007.1 – Vitula serratilineella, beehive honey moth
6008 – Vitula lugubrella
6009 W – Vitula pinei
6009.1 W – Vitula aegerella
6009.2 – Vitula insula
6009.3 – Vitula coconinoana
6010 – Vitula setonella
6011 – Vitula broweri, Brower's vitula moth
6012 – Caudellia apyrella, crescent-winged caudellia moth
6012.1 – Caudellia flordensis
6014 W – Caudellia nigrella
6014.1 – Volatica gallivorella
6015 W – Sosipatra rileyella
6016 W – Sosipatra anthophila
6016.1 – Sosipatra proximanthophila
6017 – Sosipatra thurberiae
6017.1 – Sosipatra knudsoni
6018 – Sosipatra nonparilella
6018.1 – Ribua droozi
6018.2 – Heinrichiessa sanpetella
6019 – Plodia interpunctella, Indian meal moth
6020 – Ephestia kuehniella, Mediterranean flour moth
6020.1 – Ephestia columbiella
6020.2 – Uncitruncata leuschneri
6021 – Ephestia elutella, tobacco moth
6022 – Cadra cautella, almond moth
6023 – Cadra figulilella, raisin moth
6024 – Bandera binotella
6025 – Bandera cupidinella
6026 W – Bandera virginella
6027 – Wakulla carneella
6028 – Tampa dimediatella, tampa moth
6029 – Varneria postremella
6030 – Varneria atrifasciella
6031 – Eurythmia hospitella
6031.1 W – Eurythmia spaldingella
6031.2 – Eurythmia yavapaella
6032 – Eurythmia angulella
6033 – Eurythmia fumella
6034 – Erelieva quantulella
6035 – Erelieva parvulella
6036 – Barberia affinitella
6036.1 – Bema neuricella
6037 W – Cabnia myronella
6038 – Anerastia lotella
6039 W – Coenochroa californiella
6040 W – Coenochroa illibella
6041 – Coenochroa bipunctella
6042 – Peoria longipalpella, long-palps peoria moth
6043 – Peoria bipartitella
6044 – Peoria tetradella
6045 W – Peoria opacella
6046 – Peoria floridella
6047 – Peoria rostrella
6048 – Peoria gemmatella
6049 – Peoria roseotinctella
6050 W – Peoria johnstoni
6051 – Peoria santaritella
6052 – Peoria holoponerella
6053 – Peoria approximella, carmine snout moth
6054 – Peoria luteicostella
6055 – Peoria punctata
6056 – Peoria gaudiella
6056.1 – Peoria insularis
6057 – Tolima cincaidella
6058 – Navasota hebetella
6059 – Anacostia tribulella
6060 – Arivaca pimella
6061 – Arivaca linella
6062 W – Arivaca ostreella
6063 – Arivaca poohella
6064 – Arivaca albidella
6065 – Arivaca artella
6066 – Arivaca albicostella
6067 – Atascosa glareosella
6067.1 – Atascosa heitzmani
6068 – Homosassa ella
6069 – Homosassa platella
6070 – Homosassa incudella
6071 – Homosassa blanchardi
6072 – Reynosa floscella
6073 – Goya stictella
6074 – Goya ovaliger
6074.1 – Moodnodes plorella
6075 – Uinta oreadella

Thyrididae
6076 – Thyris maculata, spotted thyris moth
6077 – Thyris sepulchralis, mournful thyris moth
6078 – Dysodia oculatana, eyed dysodia moth
6079 – Dysodia granulata
6080 – Dysodia speculifera
6081 – Dysodia flagrata
6082 – Hexeris enhydris, seagrape borer moth
6085 – Meskea dyspteraria, window-winged moth
6086 – Banisia myrsusalis, sapodilla borer moth
6087 – Banisia furva

Hyblaeidae
6088 – Hyblaea puera, teak defoliator moth

See also
List of butterflies of North America
List of Lepidoptera of Hawaii
List of moths of Canada
List of butterflies of Canada

External links
Checklists of North American Moths

Moths of North America
North America